Rayta Plot is a neighbourhood in the Korangi District in eastern Karachi, Pakistan. It was previously part of Shah Faisal Town, which was an administrative unit that was disbanded in 2011.

There are several ethnic groups in Raita Plot including Muhajirs, Sindhis, Kashmiris, Seraikis, Pakhtuns, Balochis, Memons, Bohras,  Ismailis, etc. Over 99% of the population is Muslim. The population of Shah Faisal Town is estimated to be nearly one million.

References

External links 
 Karachi Website

Neighbourhoods of Karachi
Shah Faisal Town